Imre Kiss is a former association football player who represented New Zealand at international level.

Kiss began his playing career in the national league of his native Hungary before defecting to West Germany.

Kiss moved to New Zealand and played for Hungaria in Wellington in the 1960s before making a solitary official international appearance for New Zealand in a 0–4 loss to New Caledonia on 8 November 1967.

Kiss has lived in New Plymouth, New Zealand since the 1990s.

References 

Year of birth missing (living people)
Living people
Wellington United players
New Zealand association footballers
New Zealand international footballers
Hungarian emigrants to New Zealand
Footballers from Budapest
Association footballers not categorized by position